Louise Elizabeth Redknapp (née Nurding; born 4 November 1974) is an English singer and media personality. She was a member of Eternal, an R&B girl group which debuted in 1993 with their quadruple-platinum studio album Always & Forever. In 1995, she departed from the group for a solo career.

Aside from music, Redknapp has presented several television shows and was a judge on the UK version of So You Think You Can Dance. She was married to the English former footballer Jamie Redknapp.

In 2016, Redknapp reached the final in the fourteenth series of BBC One's Strictly Come Dancing. In January 2020 following a 17-year hiatus from recording Redknapp released Heavy Love to critical acclaim. To date, Redknapp has sold over 5 million records in the UK and 15 million records worldwide. On 4 March 2021, Redknapp's memoir entitled You've Got This: And Other Things I Wish I Had Known was released.

Early life and education
Redknapp was born Louise Elizabeth Nurding was born in Lewisham, London. Her father was a builder and her mother worked at Gatwick Airport. Redknapp and her two younger brothers grew up in Eltham, London, and Oxted, Surrey. She describes herself as having come from a single-parent family with her mother.

At the age of 11, Redknapp won a scholarship to the Italia Conti Academy of Theatre Arts in London, where she met her future Eternal colleague Kéllé Bryan on her first day.

Music career

1989-1995: Career beginnings and Eternal
While out clubbing at the age of 15, Redknapp met the music producer Denis Ingoldsby, who was forming an all-girl group. She subsequently introduced Denis to Kéllé Bryan. Kéllé and Redknapp, together with sisters Easther and Vernie Bennett, formed the band Eternal in 1992. The group performed R&B, and recorded a number of hits during the 1990s. Eternal's debut single "Stay" entered the UK charts at number sixteen and climbed to number four. Redknapp left the group in 1995 to pursue a solo career, amid unsubstantiated rumours that she was forced to leave because a radio station in the United States dedicated to black music would not promote the racially mixed group. Redknapp says that she left because she was miserable and homesick.

1995-1997: Naked and Woman in Me
In late 1995, Redknapp signed a record deal with First Avenue management and EMI Records. Now professionally known simply as "Louise", her debut solo single was the orchestral ballad "Light of My Life" (which reached number eight on the UK charts). Her second solo release, "In Walked Love" (previously a hit from the self-titled 1992 album by the dance/pop group Exposé), fared less well and missed the UK top ten. However, Redknapp's third single, "Naked", turned things around and became her biggest hit to date, peaking at number five in the UK. Redknapp's debut solo album, also entitled Naked, was subsequently released in 1996 on the back of the single's success. The album received lukewarm reviews, but nevertheless peaked at number seven on the UK Albums Chart. It was later certified Platinum by the BPI for over 400,000 copies sold in the UK alone and over a million copies worldwide. Two further singles were released: "Undivided Love" (UK No. 5) and "One Kiss from Heaven" (UK No. 9).

In 1997, Redknapp returned with the single "Arms Around the World", which reached number four in the UK. Her second solo album, Woman in Me, peaked at number five in the UK and went on to gain platinum status in the UK and sold over a million units worldwide. The album also made an impact across Europe, charting in a number of countries. To support and celebrate the success of the album, Redknapp embarked on a UK-wide 'sell-out' arena tour of over twenty dates, including Wembley Arena. "Let's Go Round Again" (a cover of a song by the Average White Band) was the second single released from the album, which reached number ten. She was voted "Sexiest Woman in the World" by the readers of SKY Magazine in 1997.

1998-2001: Elbow Beach and Changing Faces
At the start of 1998, Redknapp's career was at a high point: her second album had gone platinum, she was on the cover of magazines such as Smash Hits and GQ, and she had been voted Sexiest Woman in the World by the readers of FHM magazine.

In 1998, Redknapp focused on making what she described as her "most personal album to date", Elbow Beach, released in 2000. Redknapp was more involved in the process of this album than her previous two, co-writing all 12 tracks and co-producing most of them.

The lead single from Elbow Beach, the R&B-styled "2 Faced" went straight into the charts at number three, and became Redknapp's highest-charting single. Despite initial hype and critical praise, total sales for Elbow Beach were weaker than the previous two productions, and the album peaked at number twelve. The same year, Redknapp was hired to 'sex up' the 2000 National Egg Awareness Campaign.

After Elbow Beach was released, Redknapp had one album left on her five-album deal with EMI (including Eternal's Always and Forever). In 2001, the label decided to release a greatest hits compilation, incorporating all of her top ten hit singles (including those she had performed with Eternal), called Changing Faces – The Best of Louise. The collection featured three new tracks, including a cover of Five Star's 1987 hit "The Slightest Touch". The album peaked at number nine in the UK, and she embarked on the second solo tour of her career.

EMI later released a second greatest hits album entitled Finest Moments, with a slightly different track listing.

2002-2016: Music hiatus
In 2002, Redknapp signed a £1.5 million contract with her manager Oliver Smallman's Positive Records (a division of Universal Music) to record her fourth solo album. The album was due for release in 2004 alongside the single "Bounce Back". However, due to the singer becoming pregnant with her son Charley, the album was never released. The only single released from the album was the double A-side "Pandora's Kiss"/"Don't Give Up", which peaked at number five and raised money for Tickled Pink/Breast Cancer Care. The unreleased album saw Redknapp work with the likes of Sylvia Bennett Smith and Marc 'M2E' Smith, Mark Hill and Pete Martin. The album would also have included Redknapp's first duet with boy band 3rd Wish on the track "Don't Ever Change". In the July 2004 edition of FHM magazine, Redknapp was named the "Sexiest Woman of the Decade".

2017-present: Heavy Love and Greatest Hits
In August 2017, Redknapp posted a picture of herself in the recording studio on her Instagram account, showing that she had been working on new music. On 13 September 2017, Redknapp revealed she would be returning to the music industry by announcing her first live show in more than 15 years at Under The Bridge in London on 22 December 2017. Titled 'Intimate & Live', the show had enough demand for tickets selling out in under 5 minutes, leading promoters and Redknapp to announce additional dates for January 2018 in Manchester, Glasgow, and Birmingham. On 1 February 2018, Warner/Chappell UK confirmed Redknapp had signed a deal with them to release new material later in the year. In February 2019, Redknapp announced she had signed a global record deal with ADA / Warner Music. On 25 March 2019, Redknapp announced that her fourth solo album Heavy Love would be released on 18 October 2019. The lead single, "Stretch", was released on 26 March 2019 to critical acclaim. She then released follow-up singles "Lead Me On", "Small Talk", "Breaking Back Together", "Not the Same" and "Hurt" as a bonus single after announcing Heavy Love was to be pushed back to a 2020 release.

On 10 November 2022, Redknapp released the single "Super Magic". In an interview with Fault magazine, Redknapp shared, "I wanted to make music I loved rather than just ticking a box for what worked in the industry. I think I’ve forever had to fight to prove myself [...] I’m still fighting to prove myself. I feel that the hardest hurdle is to keep on knocking down those doors to prove myself." "Super Magic" is Redknapp's first release under BMG. It debuted at number 89 on the UK Official Singles Downloads Chart Top 100 on 18 November 2022.

On 12 January 2023, Redknapp announced that her Greatest Hits collection, spanning thirty years in the music industry, would be released in June 2023. The compilation will contain five new songs, including a cover of Janet Jackson's 1997 single "Together Again".

Television career 
On television, Redknapp has presented editions of SMTV Live, CD:UK, Soccer Aid: Extra Time, This Morning, three series of the revived The Clothes Show for UKTV Style, and in March 2007 the controversial documentary The Truth About Size Zero for ITV.

In 2003, Redknapp published a magazine called Icon, aimed solely at professional sports stars and celebrities with then-husband Jamie Redknapp and former footballer Tim Sherwood. They later sold the magazine to another publisher.

Louise Redknapp has been seen as the face of a number of advertising campaigns: the "Safe and White" campaign for Boots, Flora's "Omega 3" products, Boots and BT. She became brand ambassador for Orbit gum in 2007 and a model for Avon. In autumn 2007, Redknapp was unveiled as the new face of Triumph lingerie for 2007, 2008 and 2009. In November 2008, her family were also unveiled as the Nintendo Wii Family for their Christmas 2008 advertising campaign, followed by The Louise Redknapp Nintendo Wii Fit Campaign in March 2009. In 2010, Louise and Jamie Redknapp fronted a new campaign by Thomas Cook promoting their holidays on TV and throughout the media.

In 2009, Louise Redknapp filmed a follow up documentary The Truth About Super Skinny Pregnancies displaying the pressures on women to stay in shape during and after their pregnancies. Later that year in September 2009, Redknapp presented The Farmer Wants a Wife for Five, a relaunch of a series that originally appeared on ITV in 2001. In 2009, Redknapp was also announced as the face of online fashion retailer Fashion Union. The following year in January 2010, Redknapp took over as the full-time presenter of the BBC Sunday morning programme Something for the Weekend for two years. 

Redknapp was a judge on the UK version of So You Think You Can Dance, broadcast on BBC One. In 2011, Redknapp made her acting debut alongside Ray Winstone as Diana Smith in the feature film The Hot Potato. Redknapp had a cosmetic range named Wild About Beauty, which she launched with make-up artist Kim Jacob; which she sold in 2017.

On 15 August 2016, Redknapp was announced as a contestant for the fourteenth series of Strictly Come Dancing. She reached the 2016 finals with professional dancer Kevin Clifton. In April 2018, Redknapp made her radio debut, guest-presenting two evening shows on Heart, on Sunday 8 April and Sunday 15 April. On 23 October 2018, Redknapp recorded herself narrating Roald Dahl's The Enormous Crocodile for an audio cassette release.

In May 2021, Redknapp appeared on The Masked Dancer masked as Flamingo. She was the second celebrity to be unmasked. That same month, Redknapp appeared on the first series of BBC game show I Can See Your Voice, performing "Let's Go Round Again".

Personal life
Louise Nurding married football player Jamie Redknapp at a ceremony in Bermuda on 29 June 1998. They have two sons. Prior to giving birth to her first son, Louise Redknapp suffered from endometriosis which was treated with laser surgery. The couple confirmed in September 2017 that they had separated. A family court in central London granted a decree nisi for divorce after 19 years of marriage on 29 December 2017.

In 2003, Louise Redknapp's single "Pandora's Kiss"/"Don't Give Up", was released to raise money for Breast Cancer Care's "Tickled Pink" campaign. She also participated in a celebrity edition of The Apprentice in 2008, to raise money for charity. Redknapp organised a charity sale of celebrity designer clothes at the London department store Selfridges for the charity Mothers4Children in November 2009.

Discography

Studio albums

Compilation albums

Singles

Promotional singles

Awards and nominations
{| class="wikitable sortable plainrowheaders" 
|+ Awards and nominations received by Louise Redknapp
! scope="col" | Award
! scope="col" | Year
! scope="col" | Category
! scope="col" | Nominee(s)
! scope="col" | Result
! scope="col" class="unsortable"| 
|-
! scope="row" rowspan=2|Brit Awards
| 1997
| rowspan=2|British Female Solo Artist
| rowspan=6|Herself
| 
| 
|-
| 1998
| 
| 
|-
! scope="row" rowspan=3|NME Awards
| rowspan=2|1998
| Best Solo Artist
| 
|rowspan=3|
|-
| Most Desirable Person
| 
|-
| 1999
| The Pop Personality You Would Most Like To Be Marooned On A Desert Island With 
| 
|-
! scope="row" rowspan=5|Smash Hits Poll Winners Party
| rowspan=3|1996
| Best Female Singer
| 
| rowspan=3|
|-
| Best Album
| rowspan=2|Naked
| 
|-
| Best Album Cover
| 
|-
| rowspan=2|2000
| Most Fanciable Female
| rowspan=2|Herself
| 
|rowspan=2|
|-
| Best Dressed Female
|

Notes

References

External links

Official website

1974 births
Living people
English dance musicians
English women pop singers
Eternal (band) members
Association footballers' wives and girlfriends
Alumni of the Italia Conti Academy of Theatre Arts
People from Lewisham
Singers from London
Musicians from Kent
British contemporary R&B singers
21st-century English women singers
21st-century English singers
British hip hop singers
British women hip hop musicians
Louise
EMI Records artists
Warner Records artists